Boa Vista Airport may refer to
Boa Vista International Airport in Brazil near the town of Boa Vista
Aristides Pereira International Airport or Rabil Airport in Cape Verde on the island of Boa Vista